Spermula is a French erotic fantasy film from 1976 director by Charles Matton.

Plot 

In the 1930s in the United States, a sect composed of rich and eccentric libertines who reject any idea of love, considered artistic creation as a form of evil and tried to find in total sexual freedom the ecstasy of pure being.  Following a conference that they called in New York in 1937, all members of the sect disappeared. Years later a journalist tracked them down to a secret location in the forests of South America, but is not heard from again. From out of a mist a huge flying boat wings its way through the nighttime sky. Inside, Spermula and her cohorts are on their way back to civilization to bring their message of peace and freedom to a world gone mad by "spermulising" men, which involves drawing off their sexual essence that causes aggression, acquisitiveness and jealousy. They take up residence in a mansion, whose neighbors include the town's mayor, his unhappy and abused wife, his  assistant and a widow. Spermula and her company draw together the strands of the plot that finally ends in an orgy.  The women become corrupted by this contact with the outside world and their beautiful leader, Spermula, falls in love with a young artist and sacrifices her immortality for a night of passion with him.

Production
Spermula was developed with the working title L'amour est un fleuve en Russie.

Release
Spermula was released in France in 1976.

Footnotes

References

External links

1976 films
French erotic drama films
1970s science fiction films
Erotic fantasy films
1970s French films
French science fiction films